Sunshine Susie is a 1931 British musical comedy film directed by Victor Saville and starring Renate Müller, Jack Hulbert, and Owen Nares. The film was shot at Islington Studios with sets designed by Alex Vetchinsky. It was based on a novel by István Szomaházy. An alternate German-language version The Private Secretary was made, also starring Renate Müller.

It is also known under the alternative title The Office Girl. The film established Müller as a star in Britain.

Synopsis
A young German woman moves to Vienna to seek work. With the assistance of Herr Hassell, a friendly commissionaire and budding conductor, she gains a job as a typist with a banking firm. Unknown to her, the man she takes to be a lowly clerk with the company who romances her at the local beer garden. is in fact the bank's director.

Cast
 Renate Müller as Susie Surster 
 Jack Hulbert as Herr Hasel 
 Owen Nares as Herr Arvray 
 Morris Harvey as Klapper 
 Sybil Grove as Secretary 
 Gladys Hamer as Maid 
 Daphne Scorer as Elsa 
 Barbara Gott as Minor role

Reception
The film was a big hit and was voted the best British film of 1932. Its theme song "Today I Feel So Happy" also became a major hit.

The New York Times though, regretted that the film was "not up to the mark set by the Teutonic work, for the studio acoustics appear to be faulty and in several sequences the director, Victor Saville, has failed to have his scenes as adequately lighted," although the reviewer praised the work of Jack Hulbert and Owen Nares, concluding that "Both give clever performances, the result being that this Gainsborough feature makes for quite a good hour or so of entertainment"; and the Motion Picture Herald praised the film as having "a sparkle in every foot."

References

Other film versions
 Tales of the Typewriter (December 1916, Hungary, directed by Alexander Korda)
 The Private Secretary (January 1931, Germany, directed by Wilhelm Thiele)
 Dactylo (April 1931, France, directed by Wilhelm Thiele)
 The Private Secretary (July 1931, Italy, directed by Goffredo Alessandrini)
 The Private Secretary (December 1953, West Germany, directed by Paul Martin)

Bibliography
 Bergfelder, Tim & Cargnelli, Christian. Destination London: German-speaking emigrés and British cinema, 1925–1950. Berghahn Books, 2008.
 Shafer, Stephen C. British Popular Films, 1929-1939: The Cinema of Reassurance. Routledge, 1997.
 Wood, Linda. British Films, 1927–1939. British Film Institute, 1986.

External links

1931 films
1931 musical comedy films
British musical comedy films
Films directed by Victor Saville
British remakes of German films
Films based on Hungarian novels
Islington Studios films
Gainsborough Pictures films
British black-and-white films
Films with screenplays by Franz Schulz
Films with screenplays by Victor Saville
Films set in Vienna
Films scored by Paul Abraham
1930s English-language films
1930s British films